Trevor Koenig (born 10 December 1974) is a Canadian professional ice hockey goaltender. He last played for the Dundee Stars in the UK Elite Ice Hockey League. Koenig was born in Edmonton, Alberta. Koenig currently coaches the Mighty Bulls' U7 and U17 teams.

Newcastle Vipers
In the summer of 2005 Koenig crossed the Atlantic to join the Newcastle Vipers for their first season in the UK's Elite Ice Hockey League.  The season was a huge success for the Vipers as they secured second place in the league and a 2–1 victory over the Sheffield Steelers in the end of season playoff final.

Coventry Blaze
The victory in the playoff final proved to be Koenig's swansong for the Vipers and after the season he transferred to the Coventry Blaze. In the 2005–06 season the Blaze had failed to reproduce similar results of the previous year when they had achieved a "grand slam" of the major UK Ice Hockey honours, and the signing of Koenig was a part of the rebuilding process. 2006–07 was a good season for the Blaze, they won the Elite League and the Challenge Cup, were runners up to the Cardiff Devils in the British Knockout Cup and reached the playoffs semifinals. The playoff semi final, again against Cardiff, was a difficult time for Koenig as before and after the games he flew back over the Atlantic to visit his sick father who was hospitalized.

Koenig continued with the Blaze for the 2007–08 season, but would move to mainland Europe for the 2008–09 term, signing with Rødovre IK of the Danish league and joined on 18 August 2009 to Dragons de Rouen. In July 2010 he signed a one-year deal with the Storhamar Dragons of Hamar, Norway.

Dundee Stars
On 20 January 2016, Koening signed a contract for the rest of the season with the Dundee Stars of the UK Elite Ice Hockey League.

Career statistics

Awards and honors

External links

1974 births
Atlantic City Boardwalk Bullies players
Canadian ice hockey goaltenders
Canadian people of Dutch descent
Cincinnati Mighty Ducks players
Coventry Blaze players
Dayton Bombers players
Detroit Vipers players
Dundee Stars players
Herlev Hornets players
Idaho Steelheads (WCHL) players
Living people
Long Beach Ice Dogs (IHL) players
Newcastle Vipers players
Philadelphia Phantoms players
Rødovre Mighty Bulls players
Rosenborg IHK players
Rouen HE 76 players
San Diego Gulls (ECHL) players
San Diego Gulls (WCHL) players
Ice hockey people from Edmonton
Storhamar Dragons players
Toledo Storm players
IF Troja/Ljungby players
Canadian expatriate ice hockey players in England
Canadian expatriate ice hockey players in Denmark
Canadian expatriate ice hockey players in France
Canadian expatriate ice hockey players in Norway
Canadian expatriate ice hockey players in Sweden
AHCA Division I men's ice hockey All-Americans
Canadian expatriate ice hockey players in Scotland